Flush is a 1977 American comedy film directed by Andrew J. Kuehn.

Plot
Billionaire William Randolph Hughes has placed several boxes around the American southwest, burying the first box with the instructions, "Each box has instructions to the next," with the promise of his lost fortune at the end. A collection of oddball characters embark on a comedic race to find the boxes and the lost fortune.

Cast
 William Callaway
 William Bronder
 Jeannie Linero
 Pedro Gonzalez Gonzalez
 Harvey Solin
 Sally Kirkland

References

External links
 

1977 films
American chase films
1977 comedy films
American comedy films
Films scored by Mark Snow
1970s English-language films
1970s American films